The Canon EOS DCS 1 was Kodak's third Canon-based Digital SLR camera (a rebranded Kodak EOS DCS-1). It was released in December 1995, following the cheaper EOS DCS 3, which was released earlier that year. Like that camera, it combined an EOS-1N body with a modified Kodak DCS 460 digital back. Despite offering a then-enormous resolution of 6 megapixels with a relatively large APS-H sensor, a number of technical issues (together with its 3.6 million yen price) meant that it was never a very popular camera other than for a few people with specialized roles.

Although the sensor was much larger than the EOS DCS 3, the DCS 1 had a lower fixed sensitivity of ISO 80. The large image size resulted in a burst rate of just over one image per second for two images, followed by an eight-second delay to clear the buffer. A typical contemporary 340MB PCMCIA card or IBM Microdrive could store 53 images. In line with the rest of the Kodak DCS range, the EOS DCS 1 could not produce JPEG files in camera.

The EOS DCS 1 was succeeded in 1998 by the EOS D6000 (a rebranded Kodak DCS 560).

See also
Kodak DCS

References

External links
 Canon Camera Museum: EOS DCS 1

Canon EOS DSLR cameras
Kodak DCS cameras